Chereti or Weyib is one of the woredas in the Somali Region of Ethiopia, named after its major town, Melka Chireti. Part of the Afder Zone, Chereti is bordered on the southwest by the Ganale Dorya River which separates it from the Liben Zone, on the west by Goro Bekeksa, on the north by Elekere, on the east by Afder, and on the southeast by Dolobay.

Overview
The altitude of this woreda ranges from 750 to 1700 meters above sea level. Other rivers in Chereti include the Mena and the Weyib. , Chereti has 62 kilometers of all-weather gravel road and 440 kilometers of community roads; in which around 8.69% of the total population has access to drinking water.

Flooding was reported in Chereti in May 2006, which destroyed around 9 villages and displaced more than 870 households. More than 4,500 shoats were also reported drowned by the flooding.

Major towns in Chereti include:- Hara-arba, Habal-allan, Gurro, Bardumey, Iligdheere & Dukanle.

Demographics 
Based on the 2007 Census conducted by the Central Statistical Agency of Ethiopia (CSA), this woreda has a total population of 94,295, of whom 53,341 are men and 40,954 women. While 5,152 or 5.46% are urban inhabitants, a further 53,715 or 56.97% are pastoralists. 99.3% of the population said they were Muslim. The majority of the inhabitants belong to Dhawed sub clan of Gaadsan (Dir).

Notes 

Districts of Somali Region